Lake Hills  may refer to:

Clear Lake Hills, a mountain range in Modoc County, California
Emerald Lake Hills, California
Fox Lake Hills, Illinois
Lake Hills, a mountain range in Idaho
Lake Hills Estates, California
Lake Hills, Bellevue, a neighborhood in Bellevue, Washington
Lake in the Hills, Illinois
Lakehills, Texas
West Lake Hills, Texas

See also
Lake Hill (disambiguation)
Hill Lake